The 1923 Northern Illinois State Teachers football team represented Northern Illinois State Teachers College in the 1923 college football season. The team competed in the Illinois Intercollegiate Athletic Conference, which was also known as the Little Nineteen. They were led by first-year head coach William Muir and played their home games at Glidden Field, located on the east end of campus. The Teachers finished the season with an 1–4–3 record and an 0–2–3 record in conference play. Elmer Kujala was the team's captain.

Schedule

References

Northern Illinois State
Northern Illinois Huskies football seasons
Northern Illinois State Teachers football